XHCN-FM is a radio station on 88.5 FM in Irapuato, Guanajuato, Mexico. XHCN is owned by Radio Grupo Antonio Contreras and carries the Los 40 format.

History
XHCN began as XECN-AM 1080. Owned by Antonio Contreras Hidalgo, XECN received its concession on July 1, 1963.

XECN moved to FM in 2011 on 88.5 MHz.

References

Radio stations in Guanajuato
Radio stations established in 1963